This list of structural comparison and alignment software is a compilation of software tools and web portals used in pairwise or multiple structural comparison and structural alignment.

Structural comparison and alignment

Key map:
 Class:
 Cα -- Backbone Atom (Cα) Alignment;
 AllA -- All Atoms Alignment;
 SSE -- Secondary Structure Elements Alignment;
 Seq -- Sequence-based alignment
 Pair -- Pairwise Alignment (2 structures *only*);
 Multi -- Multiple Structure Alignment (MStA);
 C-Map -- Contact Map
 Surf -- Connolly Molecular Surface Alignment
 SASA -- Solvent Accessible Surface Area
 Dihed -- Dihedral Backbone Angles
 PB -- Protein Blocks
 Flexible:
 No -- Only rigid-body transformations are considered between the structures being compared.
 Yes -- The method allows for some flexibility within the structures being compared, such as movements around hinge regions.

References

Structural bioinformatics software